Gurban is an Azerbaijani male given name that may refer to
Gurban Ali, self-declared Shah of Shirvan in the 16th century
Gurban Gurbanov (born 1972), Azerbaijani football player and manager
Gurban Mammadov (born 1959), Azerbaijani politician
Gurban Pirimov (1880–1965), Azerbaijani folk musician and tar-player
Gurban Yetirmishli (born 1952), Azerbaijan geologist and seismologist